USS Frigate Bird (AMc-27) was a Frigate Bird-class coastal minesweeper acquired by the U.S. Navy for the dangerous task of removing mines from minefields laid in the water to prevent ships from passing.

World War II service 

The first ship to be named Frigate Bird by the Navy, AMc-27 served in a noncommissioned status in the 13th Naval District between 30 January 1941 and 27 April 1943.

Frigate Bird was struck from the Navy list 27 November 1944.

References

External links 
 NavSource Online: Mine Warfare Vessel Photo Archive - Frigate Bird (AMc 27)

1935 ships
Minesweepers of the United States Navy
World War II mine warfare vessels of the United States